Okamotoperla is a genus of winter stoneflies in the family Taeniopterygidae. There is one described species in Okamotoperla, O. zonata.

References

Further reading

 
 

Taeniopterygidae